Danielle Gibson may refer to:
 Danielle Gibson (cricketer) (born 2001), English cricketer
 Danielle Gibson (softball), American softball player